Njegbwema is a village in Fiama chiefdom, Kono District in the Eastern Province of Sierra Leone. The major industry in the village is farming.

References

External links
https://web.archive.org/web/20140707005025/http://politicosl.com/2014/06/ebola-kills-57-in-sierra-leone-as-kono-bans-trade-fair/

Villages in Sierra Leone
Eastern Province, Sierra Leone